At the 2005 Jeux de la Francophonie, the athletics events were held at the Stade Général Seyni Kountché in Niamey, Niger, from 11–16 December 2005. A total of 43 events were contested, of which 23 by male and 20 by female athletes. France sent the largest squad and topped the medal table with 19 gold medals and 39 medals in total. Morocco was the next most successful nation, having won 11 golds and 31 medals altogether. This was large as a result of their middle- and long-distance running dominance which saw them take all three medals in four events, as well as three separate Moroccan 1–2 finishes. Canada and the Ivory Coast were third and fourth in the medal tally. Twenty of the 37 nations competing won a medal, although hosts Niger went empty-handed in the athletics competition.

The performances were down in comparison to the 2001 edition in Ottawa, which had benefited from being held a few weeks before the 2001 World Championships in Athletics, also in Canada that year. Two Games records were broken over the course of the competition, but a number of African athletes broke their national record – home athletes improved six different Nigerien records.

Among the prominent medallists were Moroccans Yassine Bensghir and Seltana Aït Hammou, who completed 800/1500 metres doubles on the men's and women's sides respectively. Their compatriot Zhor El Kamch won both the women's 5000 metres and 10,000 metres while Tarik Bougtaïb took a gold and a silver in the horizontal jumps. Yves Niaré of France was dominant in the throws, winning the shot put and discus throw events. Chad's efforts were led by Kaltouma Nadjina who won two golds for her 200 metres and 400 metres performances – her nation's only medals of the entire multi-sport event that year.

Records

Medal summary

Men

† = Wind speed was not recorded for this jump

Women

Medal table

Note: Arnaud Casquette of Mauritius won long jump and relay bronze medals, but then tested positive for cannabis and was given a six-month ban. However, his medals were not stripped.

Participating nations

 French Community of Belgium (2)
 (7)
 (17)
 (3)
 (11)
 (37)
 (7)
 (3)
 (6)
 (2)
 (4)
 (61)
 (10)
 (7)
 (2)
 (10)
 (3)
 (3)
 (9)
 (3)
 (4)
 (9)
 (2)
 (41)
 (5)
 (19)
 (9)
 (10)
 (14)
 (5)
 (2)
 (14)
 (4)
 (5)
 (4)
 (4)

References

Results
5èmes Jeux de la Francophonie – Résultats complets Athletisme (archived) . 2005 Niamey. Retrieved on 2010-08-01.
2005 Francophonie Games Results. Athlé. Retrieved on 2010-08-01.
Daily reports
Fuchs, Carole (2005-12-12). Francophone Games – Day 1. IAAF. Retrieved on 2010-08-01.
Fuchs, Carole (2005-12-13). Francophone Games – Day 2. IAAF. Retrieved on 2010-08-01.
Fuchs, Carole (2005-12-14). Francophone Games – Day 3. IAAF. Retrieved on 2010-08-01.
Fuchs, Carole (2005-12-15). Francophone Games – Day 4. IAAF. Retrieved on 2010-08-01.
Fuchs, Carole (2005-12-17). Francophone Games – Final Day. IAAF. Retrieved on 2010-08-01.

External links
Official website (archived) 
Francophone Games Medallists 1989–2005 from GBR Athletics

Francophonie
Athletics
2005